Pseudoceroprepes semipectinella is a species of snout moth (family Pyralidae). It was described by Achille Guenée in 1862.

Distribution
It is found on Réunion in the Indian Ocean.

References

Moths described in 1862
Phycitinae